Geoffrey Blake is the name of:

Geoffrey Blake (actor) (born 1962), American film and television actor
Geoffrey Blake (athlete) (1914–1991), English athlete
Geoffrey Blake (Royal Navy officer) (1882–1968), Fourth Sea Lord

See also
Blake (disambiguation)
Jeff Blake (born 1970), American football player